Bert Gordon may refer to:

 Bert Gordon (comedian) (1895–1974), American comedian and voice actor
 Bert I. Gordon (1922–2023), American film director
 Bert Gordon (rugby league), Australian rugby league player